Gary M. Green (born 20th century) is a musician, author, television host, gaming consultant and entrepreneur.

He was vice president of marketing for The Trump Organization and appeared on the television reality game show The Apprentice. He was also on the 2004 television special New Year's Eve with Carson Daly. Green was executive vice president of Synergy Gaming, and the public face of the company.  He was the spokesman for four years, until 2017 for Ortiz Gaming.

In 2016 it was announced that he would host a television series called "Casino Rescue".

Career

Music

Green recorded three folk-music albums from 1977 to 1982 with Folkways Records, which worked with other folk artists including Woody Guthrie and Pete Seeger. Folkways was later acquired by the Smithsonian Institution as part of the "Smithsonian Folkways" exhibition.

Green also composed music for the crime drama film Fort Apache, The Bronx (1981). The film, starring Paul Newman and Ed Asner, is about life in New York City's South Bronx from the point of view of a police officer.

Media
In the 1970s, Green was a journalist for The Gaston Gazette, a newspaper in Gastonia, North Carolina, which was later purchased by Halifax Media Group. He earned two Pulitzer Prize nominations for his writing.

In 2010, he wrote Marketing Donald Trump, a guide explaining how Green marketed Trump which can be applied to other marketing applications. In 2012, he wrote Gambling Man, which details Green's life as a modern-day casino boss through personal anecdotes.

Other activities
In the early 1990s, Green purchased part of a Russian circus. He established it as a Euro Circus attraction at Myrtle Beach, South Carolina. After he sold the circus, he joined Smith-Gardner, a Florida catalog software company. At Smith-Gardner, Green aided in development of software to take orders online when the company changed their focus from telephone and mail orders.

Casinos

By 1979, Green was working with casinos in Atlantic City, New Jersey. He patented a casino-management system based on customer relationships.

He was vice president of marketing for The Trump Organization and the Trump 29 Casino near Palm Springs, California.

Green was named president of Absentee Shawnee Gaming Enterprises in July 2004. He was general manager of the Thunderbird Wild Wild West Casino in Norman, Oklahoma and oversaw construction of another casino in Oklahoma City.

In 2005, Green co-founded Las Vegas-based casino management and development company Southern Dutch Gaming with Frank Haas, who he worked with at Trump 29.

Green was general manager of Glacier Peaks Casino in Browning, Montana, in 2006, and was hired by the Ottawa Tribe to oversee their new Four Winds Casino that same year and consulted for an Ottawa casino in Miami, Florida.

Synergy Gaming hired Green in 2009 as its executive vice president and official public face of the company. He purchased the former Gold Mine Casino in 2011. Green served for four years as spokesman and senior consultant to the president for Ortiz Gaming.

Discography
 Gary Green, Vol. 1: These Six Strings (1977)
 Gary Green, Vol. 2: Allegory (1977)
 Gary Green, Vol. 3: Still at Large (1982)

Bibliography
 Marketing Donald Trump (2010, Penny Arcades)
 Gambling Man (2012, Penny Arcades)

See also

 List of people from Florida
 List of people from Montana
 List of people from North Carolina
 List of people from New Jersey
 List of people from Montana
 List of people from Las Vegas
 List of people from Norman, Oklahoma
 List of people from Palm Springs, California

References

External links
 

Year of birth missing (living people)
Place of birth missing (living people)
20th-century births
20th-century American businesspeople
20th-century American non-fiction writers
20th-century American composers
21st-century American businesspeople
21st-century American composers
21st-century American non-fiction writers
American autobiographers
American business writers
American casino industry businesspeople
American company founders
American film score composers
American gambling writers
American male journalists
American newspaper journalists
American patent holders
Businesspeople from California
Businesspeople from Florida
Businesspeople from Montana
Businesspeople from Nevada
Businesspeople from New Jersey
Businesspeople from North Carolina
Businesspeople from Oklahoma
Businesspeople from South Carolina
Circus owners
Journalists from California

Journalists from Montana
Journalists from New Jersey
Journalists from North Carolina
Journalists from South Carolina
American male film score composers
Musicians from Palm Springs, California
Musicians from Atlantic City, New Jersey
People from Gastonia, North Carolina
People from Glacier County, Montana
Musicians from Las Vegas
People from Myrtle Beach, South Carolina
Musicians from Norman, Oklahoma
Songwriters from California
Songwriters from Florida
Songwriters from Montana
Songwriters from Nevada
Songwriters from New Jersey
Songwriters from North Carolina
Songwriters from Oklahoma
Songwriters from South Carolina
Writers from Palm Springs, California
Living people
Writers from Atlantic City, New Jersey
20th-century American male writers
20th-century American male musicians
21st-century American male musicians
21st-century American male writers
American male songwriters